Xaxli'p, also known as the Fountain or the Fountain Indian Band, is a First Nations government located in the Central Interior-Fraser Canyon region of the Canadian province of British Columbia.  It is a member of the Lillooet Tribal Council, which is the largest grouping of band governments of the St'at'imc people (aka the Lillooet people). 

The offices of the Xaxli'p band government are located at Fountain, about 10 miles up the Fraser Canyon from the town of Lillooet.  Fountain is known in the St'at'imcets language as Cácl'ep or Xaxli'p.

Chief and Councillors
The Chief is Colleen Jacob and Councillors are Chester Alec, Bernard John, Shonna Jacob, Rena Joseph, Curtis Joseph, and Pauline Michell.

Language

Treaty process
The Xaxli'p entered the British Columbia Treaty Process in December 1993. The parties signed a framework agreement (stage 3 of the six-stage process) in November 1997.

They focused on internal research, including substantial work on a traditional use study and an ecosystem-based plan for their territory. They resumed negotiations in July 2000, and the parties worked towards interim agreements, including a water quality study and a community forest pilot agreement. In March 2001, the Xaxli'p left the negotiating table, according to the provincial government.

History
Xaxl'ip Chief Thomas Adolph signed the Declaration of the Lillooet Tribe and travelled to Ottawa to express grievances over land rights as a member of the 1916 delegation of the newly formed Indian Rights Association.

Demographics
The registered population of the Xaxli'pemc (people of Xaxli'p) in 2013 was 1,004, 609 of whom live off-reserve.  Of the on-reserve population in 2006, the median age for males was 28.7 versus 39.5 for females.

See also
Roger Adolph

References

External links
 xaxlip.ca/

St'at'imc governments
First Nations governments in the Fraser Canyon
Lillooet Country